Gardyne is a Scottish surname from the county of Angus. The family or Clan Gardyne originated in the environs of Gardyne Castle; their seat was Friockheim, Angus, Scotland.

People with this surname include:
 John Gardyne of Lawton and Middleton, MP for Angus, 1667
 Thomas Gardyne of Middleton, Scottish landowner, founder of Friockheim
 Alfred Gardyne de Chastelain, Scottish businessman, soldier and spy
 John Bruce-Gardyne, Baron Bruce-Gardyne, Conservative MP for Angus
 Lucinda Bruce-Gardyne, entrepreneur and cookery writer

References

Scottish surnames